Michał Rosa (born 27 September 1963 in Zabrze) is a Polish movie director.  He is a graduate from the Krzysztof Kieślowski Film School in Katowice.

Filmography
"Piłsudski" (2019)
"Szczęście Świata" (2016)
Scratch (2008)
"Co słonko widziało" (2006)
Cisza (2001)
"Farba" (1998)
"Gorący czwartek" (1994)

External links

Polish film directors
Krzysztof Kieślowski Film School alumni
1963 births
Living people
People from Zabrze